The  New Math was a brief, dramatic change in the way mathematics was taught in American grade schools, and to a lesser extent in European countries, during the 1960s.

New Math may also refer to:

"New Math (song)",  a satirical song by Tom Lehrer
A song by Bo Burnham from Bo Burnham (album)
 A song by Drive Like Jehu from their album Yank Crime.